James White (1809 – 9 January 1883) was a British Liberal Party politician who sat in the House of Commons between 1857 and 1874.

White was the second son of William White of Tulse Hill, Surrey and his wife Susannah née Weeks. He was educated privately. He was merchant in the City of London, principally engaged in trade with China. From 1835 to 1851, he was an alderman of the City. In 1833 he married Mary Lind.

At the 1857 general election White was elected as one of the two Members of Parliament (MPs) for Plymouth, but he lost the seat two years later at the 1859 general election. In July 1860 he was elected at a by-election as an MP for Brighton. He held the seat until his defeat at the 1874 general election.

White died at his residence in South Kensington, London, in 1883 at the age of 73.

References

External links

1809 births
1883 deaths
UK MPs 1857–1859
UK MPs 1859–1865
UK MPs 1865–1868
UK MPs 1868–1874
Liberal Party (UK) MPs for English constituencies
Councilmen and Aldermen of the City of London
Members of the Parliament of the United Kingdom for Plymouth